Jayden Osei Addai (born 26 August 2005) is a Dutch footballer who currently plays as a forward for Jong AZ.

Career statistics

Club

Notes

References

2005 births
Living people
Dutch footballers
Netherlands youth international footballers
Dutch people of Ghanaian descent
Association football forwards
Eerste Divisie players
AZ Alkmaar players
Jong AZ players